Jacob Egeris Pedersen (born 19 May 1990) is a Danish professional footballer plays as a centre-back for B.93.

Early life
Egeris played football during his youth for BK Søllerød-Vedbæk, until he moved to Lyngby in December 2006. He spent 2 years in the Lyngby youth setup.

Senior career

Lyngby Boldklub
Egeris got his debut on 20 September 2009, coming on as a substitute against Vejle Boldklub. He'd go on to make league appearances in his debut season in the 1st Division and was given a one-year contract extension in December 2009. Playing 22 games in his first season, Egeris helped Lyngby win promotion to the Danish Superliga, with a second place league finish.

In the second game of the 2010–11 season, Egeris was injured with damage to his ankle in a match with AC Horsens. He would be out injured until November, making an unexpected return filling in for Mathias Tauber who pulled out last minute because of illness, losing to Randers FC in a 3–0 defeat in the Danish Cup. He received a hostile reaction from the Lyngby supporters due to his contractual situation, choosing to follow the recent trend of former Lyngby players to leave on a free transfer to join neighboring rivals F.C. Nordsjælland, when his contract was set to expire in the winter.

F.C. Nordsjælland
Jacob Egeris joined FCN in January 2011, signing a three-year contract. Shortly after joining, Egeris re-injured himself in training which kept him out for the rest of the 2010–11 season. On 31 August 2011, it was confirmed by Egeris' agent that he was considering a move to Viborg after failing to break into the F.C. Nordsjælland squad due to injury set backs, after spending a year and a half with the Farum club. He eventually turned down a loan move to The Greens, deciding to stay with FCN to try and break into the first team.

On 24 November 2011, Egeris made his first team debut as a substitute in the 90th minute, in a 2–0 loss to F.C. Copenhagen, in the Danish Cup quarter finals. He would go on to make his league debut for the club a week later, as an 81st-minute substitute for Patrick Mtiliga, in a 0–0 draw with F.C. Midtjylland.

Nykøbing FC
After two years in Norway, joining HamKam in July 2017, Egeris returned to Denmark in February 2020 and signed with Nykøbing FC.

B.93
On 30 January 2023, Egeris joined Danish 2nd Division club B.93.

Career statistics

Club

Honours
Viborg
Danish 1st Division: 2012–13, 2014–15

References 

Viborg siger farvel til Andersen og Egeris, bold.dk 19 May 2016

External links 

 

1990 births
Living people
Danish men's footballers
Danish expatriate men's footballers
FC Nordsjælland players
Lyngby Boldklub players 
Viborg FF players
Vejle Boldklub players
Hamarkameratene players
Nykøbing FC players
Boldklubben af 1893 players
Danish Superliga players
Danish 1st Division players
Norwegian First Division players
Norwegian Second Division players
Danish expatriate sportspeople in Norway
Expatriate footballers in Norway
Association football defenders
Footballers from Copenhagen